Gibberella is a genus of fungi in the family Nectriaceae. In 1926, Japanese scientists observed that rice plants infected with Gibberella had abnormally long stems ("foolish seedling disease").  A substance, gibberellin, was derived from this fungus.  Gibberellin is a plant hormone that promotes cell elongation, flower formation, and seedling growth.

Etymology
Pier Andrea Saccardo named the genus "Gibberella" because of the hump (Latin, gibbera) on the fungal perithecium.<ref name=Desjardins>[https://pubag.nal.usda.gov/download/33179/pdf GIBBERELLA FROM A (VENACEAE) TO Z' (EAE)], by Anne E. Desjardins; originally published in Annual Review of Phytopathology, 2003. 41:177–98; doi:10.1146/annurev.phyto.41.011703.115501</ref>

SpeciesGibberella acerinaGibberella acervalisGibberella acuminataGibberella africanaGibberella agglomerataGibberella atrofuligineaGibberella atrorufaGibberella australisGibberella avenaceaGibberella baccataGibberella bambusaeGibberella bolusiellaeGibberella bresadolaeGibberella briosianaGibberella butleriGibberella buxiGibberella cantareirensisGibberella cicatrisataGibberella circinataGibberella coffeaeGibberella coronicolaGibberella creberrimaGibberella culmicolaGibberella cyaneaGibberella cyanogenaGibberella cyanosporaGibberella cylindrosporaGibberella effusaGibberella englerianaGibberella euonymiGibberella ficinaGibberella flaccaGibberella fujikuroi G. fujikuroi var. subglutinansGibberella fusisporaGibberella gaditjirriiGibberella gordoniiGibberella gossypinaGibberella heterochromaGibberella hostaeGibberella imperataeGibberella indicaGibberella intricansGibberella juniperiGibberella konzaGibberella lagerheimiiGibberella lateritiaGibberella longisporaGibberella macrolophaGibberella malvacearumGibberella mapaniaeGibberella maximaGibberella nemorosaGibberella nygamaiGibberella parasiticaGibberella passifloraeGibberella phyllostachydicolaGibberella polycoccaGibberella pseudopulicarisGibberella pulicarisGibberella quinqueseptataGibberella rhododendricolaGibberella rugosaGibberella sacchariGibberella spiraeaeGibberella stilboidesGibberella subtropicaGibberella thapsinaGibberella tilakiiGibberella tricinctaGibberella triticiGibberella tropicalisGibberella tumidaGibberella ulicisGibberella venezuelanaGibberella violaceaGibberella vitisGibberella xylarioidesGibberella zeae''

See also

 Auxin
 Ethylene as a plant hormone
 Gibberellic acid

References

External links 
A Gibberella primer
Gibberella on an ear of corn

 
Nectriaceae genera
Fungal plant pathogens and diseases